Learn To Be is a US based 501(c)(3) non-profit organization bringing free, online tutoring to underserved youth around the United States. We primarily serve families experiencing homelessness, youth in foster care, and families with low incomes. We source volunteer tutors through schools, partnerships and community groups and pair these students with volunteer tutors that form lasting relationships that span years. Headquartered in Southern California, our staff and the youth we serve are from all around the country. 

Since inception, Learn To Be has provided 144,728 hours of tutoring to 8,518 youth across the United States.

The Need
The need that LTB originally addressed was that students who needed extra help academically were not able to afford it. These students usually came from school districts that were under-resourced and unable to offer free tutoring. This remains the primary need we address: to help students who need academic help that their parents, schools, and communities are not able to provide. What has changed since the pandemic is the increased level of educational inequity caused by school closures.

When a child is born into a family that is experiencing poverty, homelessness, or racism, it usually means that they will not have the same advantages and opportunities to succeed academically as more fortunate kids. Most of our students are non-white (74%), come from families with incomes less than $50,000 (85%), and attend underfunded schools. According to a 2021 report by the Children’s Defense Fund, “Large disparities in school funding mean that children living in lower-wealth areas—often children of color and children growing up in poverty—also attend under-funded schools that have fewer high-quality teachers, fewer curricular resources, larger class sizes, and less student support. More than 77 percent of Hispanic and more than 79 percent of Black fourth and eighth-grade public school students were not proficient in reading or math in 2019 compared with less than 60 percent of white students”. 

Regardless of a family's income status or ethnicity, the thing that almost all parents have in common is the desire for their children to do well academically, finish school, and go on to college and/or find a meaningful, well-paying career. While what “success” means and looks like can differ among families, cultures, and communities, all parents want their children to experience economic self-sufficiency, happiness, and well-being. Parents that have never experienced these things themselves are sometimes at a loss as to how to help their children attain them. Sometimes, they have not finished school themselves, so they just don’t know what type of help their child needs or how to access it. Often the parents are busy working several jobs, so they are not available to help with homework, yet despite working so hard they are still unable to afford typical tutoring.

Our Service
Learn To Be provides support for as long as it takes to help students meet their goals. Our services are provided at no cost, although some families (about 30%) offer to pay a small voluntary share of $9 - $30 a month. We work to ensure that our students work with the same tutor each session because we know that supportive relationships can foster a deeper level of learning and because it’s simply exhausting to have to start over with a new tutor every time. There are two paths for students receiving tutoring from LTB. Some students join us after their families apply directly on our website while others are connected to us through partnerships with other organizations such as non-profits, youth-serving agencies, ministries, or after-school programs.  

Tutors discover and volunteer at LTB by either contacting us directly through our tutor application or through a partnership. Our most active partnerships are high school and college “LTB Chapters” held at over 157 different college or high school campuses across the country. Most of our tutors are high-achieving high school or college students, and some are young professionals or retirees. Our tutors join LTB by filling out an application that includes questions about their academic background, experience, motivation for volunteering, length of desired commitment, and any past legal issues. The prospective tutor submits a short video explaining why they believe they are a good fit. We review each application carefully and only accept those tutors that we feel are deeply committed and will provide an excellent and safe experience for our students. 

Tutors and students meet one to two times per week in our online classroom or via Zoom. Sessions can focus on math (56%), science (6%), reading (25%), writing (10%), or other subjects (3%). Tutors may also work with more than one student, and a student might have two or even three tutors if they need significant help in multiple areas. Most tutor/student matches last approximately six months and usually meet 4-8 times each month.

Impact
Our approach is working; our students see an average test score increase of 15.52% and a GPA increase of 1.64, and maybe more importantly, many parents tell us they have an increased level of self-confidence and a new belief in their ability to learn. You can follow our data in real time at https://www.learntobe.org/the-numbers

 LTB has provided over 135,506 hours of tutoring during 180,262 tutoring sessions to 7,834 youth who might otherwise not have been able to receive it.
 We have developed almost 100 chapters on college and high school campuses, which work to recruit qualified, dedicated young tutors. 
 We have worked with over 150 partner agencies, including after-school programs, youth-serving nonprofits, schools, ministries, sports programs, and government initiatives. 
 61% of our families receive tutoring free of charge. A small percentage of our families (29%) pay a nominal fee of $5 to $30 per month. 

During 2022 we provided:

 3,500 students with tutoring
 2,700 tutors with meaningful opportunities for volunteering
 50,000 hours of online tutoring 

During 2023 we anticipate the following outcomes:

 We will provide 90,000 hours of tutoring
 We will help 6,000 students

Chapters

UCLA
Students at the University of California, Los Angeles established the first University Chapter of Learn To Be. They are currently officially registered with the University.

UT Austin
Learn To Be is an officially registered student organization at The University of Texas at Austin. The organization is advised by Dr. Prabhudev Konana, a professor in the Department of Information, Risk, and Operations Management at the McCombs School of Business.

UT Dallas
Derek Chui, 19, a Collegium V Honors student, established a chapter at UT Dallas. The chapter works with the McKinney Independent School District and Plano Independent School District, tutoring on-site and online.

Syracuse University
The Learn To Be Chapter at Syracuse University works with Say Yes to Education in the local Syracuse school districts to provide free tutoring to underprivileged students. Michael Hu, the Renee Crown Honors student at Syracuse who founded the chapter, was featured in the Honors Messenger Newsletter.

Cornell University
As of March 2011, students Stephen Lane and Odis Ponce are starting a chapter at Cornell University. They are participating in Online Leadership Exchanges with leaders from the Foundation and other University Chapters.

University of California, San Diego (UCSD)
Seung Jin Lee and a group of undergraduate students officially registered and established a chapter at UCSD in the fall of 2011. The organization currently volunteers on-site for underprivileged children.

University of Michigan, Ann Arbor
Wolverine Tutors, an existing organization dedicated to providing online tutoring and mentoring for at-risk high school students, registered as a chapter of Learn to Be in 2012.

Partnerships
Local food establishments in Anaheim sponsored Learn To Be's first benefit dinner in August 2009. Hulu.com also broadcasts a commercial for Learn To Be.

Fundraising
In December 2009, supporters tried to garner votes for Learn To Be in the Chase Community Giving program. In June 2010, The Orange County Register reported that nearly 100 people participated in a walk/run event that raised more than $3,000 for the Learn To Be Foundation.

References

External links
 Learn To Be

Organizations established in 2008
Educational charities based in the United States
Charities based in California